First Look Studios was a former American independent film distributor, that specialized in home video releases of films and television series.

History
In 1980, Robert and Ellen Little founded Overseas Filmgroup as a film sales company for foreign markets. Overseas Filmgroup expanded towards film financing to give the company greater control over its output. From the beginnings, it competed with fellow, also-defunct film producers J&M Film Sales (later J&M Entertainment), Manson International and Producers Sales Organization as the most successful company with film sales.

Overseas Filmgroup decided to paid $3 million in order to set up operations for different areas such as Spain, Arizona, Texas, Taiwan, Italy, southern California and Colorado in the mid-1980s, and by 1986, the company became active, setting up a number of domestic theatrical, home video and television syndication sales with New World Pictures and other distributors.

In 1987, while other sales companies is gaining production outfits, the Littles told that they would avoid production, so Overseas Filmgroup had set up a company policy that they would acquire new films via distribution advances, and the three new movies, namely those directed by Roland Emmerich, will be offered to various Mifed buyers. The company is the original international home video distributor for the show Tales from the Darkside, until it was sold off to Lorimar-Telepictures in late November 1987 after Lorimar International president Jeff Schlesinger saw all episodes of the show that was well-suited and combined to become eight ninety-minute episodes from the show.

Films ranged from genre titles such as Blue Tiger (starring Virginia Madsen) and No Way Back (starring New Zealand actor Russell Crowe) to art house films, including Antonia's Line, Mrs. Dalloway, The Secret of Roan Inish, Waking Ned Devine, and Titus. In 1993, the company expanded towards North American distribution through its First Look Pictures subsidiary.

In 1998, Overseas Filmgroup went public. Two years later, EUE/Screen Gems acquired a minority interest in the company. In January 2001, as part of a restructuring, Overseas Filmgroup and First Look Pictures became subsidiaries of First Look Media. Overseas Filmgroup was eventually renamed First Look International. Robert and Ellen Little left First Look in 2003.

On July 29, 2005, after a merger with Canadian businessman Henry Winterstern's Capital Entertainment, the combined company became First Look Studios. Winterstern became CEO of First Look and shared the role as chairman with EUE/Screen Gems' Chris Cooney. In November 2005, First Look acquired DEJ Productions from Blockbuster.

In March 2006, First Look acquired Ventura Distribution, a home video distribution company, and acquired the domestic television syndication rights to fifty six films from Pinnacle Entertainment. By 2006, First Look had a seven hundred film library to its own name, and continued to add more with the financing of in house productions. Henry Winterstern resigned from First Look in March 2007. The organization started out First Look Television, a TV syndication company in 2006.

That March, Nu Image acquired the rights to First Look. In November 2010, Millennium Entertainment acquired First Look's assets. Currently, the company had been dissolved.

Films
10 Items or Less (released theatrically by ThinkFilm)
All About You
American Adobo
An American Crime
Aqua Teen Hunger Force Colon Movie Film for Theaters (the only animated film by the company)
As Good as Dead
August 
Back in the Day
Bad Lieutenant: Port of Call New Orleans
The Breed
A Brother's Kiss
Chopper
Chrystal
Cool Dog
The Contract
Danika
Day of the Dead
Day Zero
Dedication (co distribution with The Weinstein Company)
Eat Your Heart Out
Ernest Goes to Africa (re released by Mill Creek Entertainment and Image Entertainment)
Ernest in the Army (re released by Mill Creek Entertainment and Image Entertainment)
 Evelyn (co-distribution with United Artists)
Finding Rin Tin Tin
Firecracker
Flu Birds
Forty Shades of Blue
Four Sheets to the Wind
Frank
Freeze Frame
A Gentleman's Game
Glass Trap
God's Gift
A Guide to Recognizing Your Saints
Hydra
Immortal (United States distributor)
In a Dark Place
Infinity
Journey to the End of the Night
Kill Switch
King of California
King of the Avenue
Labor Pains
Leaves of Grass
Leo
A Little Trip to Heaven
A Map of the World
Marcello Mastroianni: I Remember
Mayor of the Sunset Strip
Meet Bill
Minotaur (co distribution with Lionsgate)
Miranda
Monster (co distribution with Newmarket Films, Media 8 Entertainment and DEJ Productions)
Mrs Dalloway
My Son, My Son, What Have Ye Done?
Nature Unleashed: Tornado
Paris, je t'aime
Party Girl
The Prophecy (co distribution with Dimension Films)
The Pumpkin Karver
Relative Strangers
The Secret of Roan Inish
Sex and Breakfast
Silence Becomes You
Smiley Face
Stiletto
Sukiyaki Western Django
Tara Road
Target of OpportunityThe Thing BelowThick as ThievesThis Is The SeaTrading Mom (co distribution with Trimark Pictures)TranssiberianThe Volcano Disaster (also called Volcano: Nature Unleashed)War, Inc.''

Distributed lines
 Ultimate Fighting Championship
 Video Asia

References

External links
 Official Website

Film distributors of the United States
Film production companies of the United States
Mass media companies established in 1993
Mass media companies disestablished in 2010
Home video companies of the United States
Privately held companies based in California
Companies based in Thousand Oaks, California
Defunct mass media companies of the United States
Defunct companies based in Greater Los Angeles
Culture of Thousand Oaks, California
2008 mergers and acquisitions